Museo del horror (in English, "Museum of Horror") is a 1964 Mexican mystery thriller horror black-and-white film directed by Rafael Baledón and starring Julio Alemán, Patricia Conde and Joaquín Cordero.

Plot
Many women disappear under mysterious circumstances, generating a climate of terror and paranoia in the entire population of a town. All the clues point to the same museum.

Cast
Julio Alemán as Dr. Raúl
Patricia Conde as Marta
Joaquín Cordero as Luis
Olivia Michel as Norma Ramos
Carlos López Moctezuma as Professor Abramov
David Reynoso as Police Chief
Emma Roldán as Doña Leonor
Sonia Infante as Sonia
Armando Soto La Marina as Lencho (as Arturo Soto la Marina "Chicote")
Julián de Meriche as Police Detective
Arturo Castro as Gendarme (as Arturo Castro "Bigotón")
Carlos León as Police Detective
Guillermo Bravo Sosa as Watchman (uncredited)
José Dupeyrón as Grave Robber (uncredited)
Jesús Gómez as Policeman (uncredited)
Leonor Gómez as Maid (uncredited)
Vicente Lara as Grave Robber (uncredited)
José Pardavé as Doctor (uncredited)

Production
The film was influenced by House of Wax. It features stock footage from the 1961 Italian sword-and-sandal film Hercules in the Haunted World.

Reception
Vicente Muñoz Álvarez in Cult Movies 2. Películas para la penumbra said of the film, "Naive in its approach, hasty in its development and clumsy in its outcome, Museo del horror, however, perfectly transmits the spirit of the best pulp literature and B series cinema of the time."

References

External links

1964 films
1960s Spanish-language films
1960s horror thriller films
1960s mystery thriller films
1964 horror films
Mexican horror thriller films
Mexican mystery thriller films
Films directed by Rafael Baledón
1960s Mexican films